Ceres Trampling the Attributes of War is an oil on canvas allegorical painting of Ceres by Simon Vouet, executed in 1635. It is held  in the Musée Thomas-Henry in Cherbourg-Octeville.

The painting depicts Ceres, the goddess of agriculture, triumphing over war. The goddess is represented with ears of corn in her left hand, an iconographic attribute of Ceres.

Sources
V. V. A. A. (2010). Mitología clásica e iconografía cristiana, pág. 72. R. Areces. .

Paintings by Simon Vouet
1635 paintings
17th-century allegorical paintings
Allegorical paintings by French artists
Ceres (mythology)
Paintings of Roman goddesses